Riccia crassifrons is a species of liverwort belonging to the family Ricciaceae.

A study in tropical Ecuador found that Riccia crassifrons was typically found in urban environments, suggesting that the species is tolerant to anthropogenic effects such as the presence of wastewater and heavy metal pollution.

References

Ricciaceae